Naseef Ali (also spelled Naseef, Nassef or Nasiff) is an Arabic masculine given and surname originating in the Eastern Mediterranean, primarily from Lebanon and Syria, derived from the Arabic word nasif meaning just or fair-minded.

Given name
 Nassif Ghoussoub, Canadian mathematician
 Nasif Estéfano (1932–1973), Argentine racing driver 
 Nassif Majdalani (1913–1988), Lebanese media presenter and football president
 Nasif al-Nassar (d. 1781), autonomous Shia leader of South Lebanon during Ottoman era 
 Nasif Al-Yaziji (1800–1871), Lebanese author and prominent figure in the Nahda movement
 Nassif Zeytoun, Syrian singer

Surname
Abdullah Omar Nasseef (born 1939), Saudi chemist and geologist
 Ali Hussein Nassif (d. 2012), founding member of Hezbollah, former commander of all Hezbollah troops in the Syrian Civil War before being killed by rebels.
 Gabriel Nassif, French professional card player
 Henry Joseph Nasiff Jr., better known as "Hank the Angry Drunken Dwarf," member of "The Wack Pack" on The Howard Stern Show (1962-2001)
 Muhammad Nasif Khairbek, senior internal security official in Syria.
 Paul Nassif, Beverly Hills plastic surgeon featured on the reality television series Botched and The Real Housewives of Beverly Hills
 Zaki Nassif (1918-2004), Lebanese folk music composer

Places
 The Nassif Building, former headquarters of the United States Department of Transportation
 Nasseef House, sometimes known as Nassif House, historical landmark in Jeddah, Saudi Arabia

Fictional characters
 Dr. Leila Nassif, fictional character in the PC game Deus Ex: Invisible War characters

References

Arabic-language surnames
Arabic masculine given names